Dimas Sumantri (born 17 November 1995) is an Indonesian professional footballer who plays as a full-back.

Honours

Club
PSMS Medan
 Liga 2 runner-up: 2017

International
Indonesia U-19
 AFF U-19 Youth Championship: 2013

References

External links
 Dimas Sumantri at Soccerway
 Dimas Sumantri at Liga Indonesia

1995 births
Living people
Indonesian footballers
Sportspeople from North Sumatra
PSDS Deli Serdang players
Semen Padang F.C. players
PSMS Medan players
Liga 2 (Indonesia) players
Liga 1 (Indonesia) players
Association football defenders
21st-century Indonesian people